Oladeinde Olusoga Joseph (born 1948) is a Nigerian Navy admiral who was military governor of Ogun State, Nigeria between August 1990 and January 1992 during the military administration of General Ibrahim Babangida, handing over power to the elected civilian governor Segun Osoba.

He was instrumental in establishing the Nigerian Navy Secondary School, Abeokuta. Other construction in Abeokuta during his administration included the South-West Resource Centre and the Abeokuta Golf Course.

References

Ogun State
1948 births
Living people
Yoruba military personnel
Governors of Ogun State